Daniel Eich (born 2 April 2000) is a Swiss judoka. He won one of the bronze medals in the men's 100 kg event at the 2022 European Judo Championships held in Sofia, Bulgaria.

He won the silver medal in his event at the 2022 Judo Grand Prix Almada held in Almada, Portugal.

References

External links
 

Living people
2000 births
Place of birth missing (living people)
Swiss male judoka
21st-century Swiss people